Glen Cowie is a Roman Catholic Mission located in Ga-Moloi under Kwena Madihlaba Sekhukhune District Municipality in the Limpopo province of South Africa. It is bordered to the west by Phokwane, to the east by Jane Furse; to the south by Ga-Malaka.

Health facilities

 St. Rita's Hospital 
 St Rita's Clinic

References

Populated places in the Makhuduthamaga Local Municipality